3240 Laocoon  is a carbonaceous Jupiter trojan from the Trojan camp, approximately  in diameter. It was discovered on 7 November 1978, by American astronomers Eleanor Helin and Schelte Bus at Palomar Observatory in California. The D-type asteroid belongs to the 100 largest Jupiter trojans and has a rotation period of 11.3 hours. It was named after Laocoön from Greek mythology.

Classification and orbit 

Laocoon resides in the Trojan camp of Jupiter's  Lagrangian point, which lies 60° behind the gas giant's orbit. It is also a non-family asteroid of the Jovian background population.

It orbits the Sun at a distance of 4.6–5.9 AU once every 11 years and 12 months (4,375 days; semi-major axis of 5.23 AU). Its orbit has an eccentricity of 0.13 and an inclination of 2° with respect to the ecliptic.

Physical characteristics 

Laocoon has been characterized as a D-type asteroid by Pan-STARRS survey and in the SDSS-based taxonomy. It has a V–I color index of 0.88.

Lightcurve 

In April 1996, Laocoon was observed by Italian astronomer Stefano Mottola using the now decommissioned Bochum 0.61-metre Telescope at ESO's La Silla Observatory in Chile.

Diameter and albedo 

According to the NEOWISE mission of NASA's Wide-field Infrared Survey Explorer, the Jovian asteroid measures 51.7 kilometers in diameter and its surface has an albedo of 0.060, while the Collaborative Asteroid Lightcurve Link assumes a standard albedo for a carbonaceous asteroid of 0.057 and calculates a diameter of 50.8 kilometers with an absolute magnitude of 10.2.

Naming 

This minor planet was named after the Troyan priest Laocoön from Greek mythology. He and both his sons were killed by serpents sent by the gods because he tried to expose the Greek's deception of the Trojan Horse. The official naming citation was published by the Minor Planet Center on 7 September 1987.

See also 
 Laocoön (El Greco)

References

External links 
 Asteroid Lightcurve Database (LCDB), query form (info )
 Dictionary of Minor Planet Names, Google books
 Discovery Circumstances: Numbered Minor Planets (1)-(5000) – Minor Planet Center
 Asteroid 3240 Laocoon at the Small Bodies Data Ferret
 
 

003240
Discoveries by Eleanor F. Helin
Discoveries by Schelte J. Bus
Named minor planets
19781107